Wangerooge is one of the 32 Frisian Islands in the North Sea located close to the coasts of the Netherlands, Germany and Denmark. It is also a municipality in the district of Friesland in Lower Saxony in Germany.

Wangerooge is one of the East Frisian Islands. It is the easternmost and smallest of the inhabited islands in this group (according to some other measurements, Baltrum is the smallest) and the only one that belonged to the historical district of Oldenburg between 1815 and 1947, whereas Borkum, Juist, Norderney, Baltrum, Langeoog and Spiekeroog always belonged to the county of Ostfriesland. As of the census of 2004, the island has 1,055 inhabitants. Especially in summer the island accommodates more than 7,000 visitors a day.

Wangerooge is separated from the island of Spiekeroog by a gat known as the Harle.

The island is attractive to tourists due to the beaches, various recreation facilities and its relaxed atmosphere. The island's slogan, visible on a sign at the harbor, emphasizes this: "God created time, but he never mentioned haste."
A yearly beach volleyball tournament, usually held at the beginning of August, is one of the main attractions in the summer, and has served to modify the general impression that the island is exclusively attractive to older people and young families. In addition, windsurfing, kite-surfing and board-riding activities attract younger people.

In order to guarantee a relaxed atmosphere, cars are prohibited on the island. The island can be reached by ship from Harlesiel, or it can be reached by plane via its airfield, regular service being offered from Harlesiel, Bremen, or Hamburg. The ferries leave at different times every day according to the tide. As on most East Frisian Islands, a small narrow gauge railway line, the Wangerooge Island Railway, connects the harbor to the main village.

As for historical sites and other places of interest, the island has one active lighthouse, one old lighthouse, and the Western Tower. Since the whole island used to be shifting constantly eastwards until sea defenses were built a century ago, old buildings were gradually lost to the sea. The Western Tower was built in 1597 and was originally in the east of the island.

Wangerooge is also known as the site of a historic World War II B-17 Flying Fortress crash, or rather a double crash. During a bombing mission on Hamburg on New Year's Eve, 1944, a B-17 squadron was attacked by German fighter planes on its homeward flight. While in tight formation, one plane was shot down and became entangled with the plane below it. One of the pilots managed to take control of the two aircraft and steer them back towards the German coast for an emergency landing. At the time, the two entangled aircraft were described as resembling breeding dragonflies as the ball turrets of each plane were caught in the chassis of the other. Most of the crew bailed out, while two remained and successfully made a crash landing in a field.

Wangerooge has an airfield with scheduled services.

Geography

Location 
Wangerooge is a German island in the southern North Sea and is the easternmost of the seven inhabited East Frisian islands. The island stretches over 8.5 kilometers in length in the east-west direction. The north-south extension is a maximum of 2.2 kilometers in the western part, and 1.2 kilometers at the level of the village. The distance to the mainland is 7 kilometers. To the west of Wangerooge, which is separated by the Gat of Harle, the eastern Spiekeroog is 2 kilometers away. Separated by the Blaue Balje, the island Minsener Oog begins, which is 2 kilometers east-southeast. On the northside, there is a sandy beach that is about 100 meters wide and 3 kilometers long. In the east, this beach merges into a 500 meter wide and 3 kilometer long field with sand deposits. In the west of the island, there are two more beaches that are ½ kilometer and 1 kilometer in length. To the south of the island lies the Wadden Sea, which is part of the Lower Saxon Wadden Sea National Park, like the islands, and is very dry at Baseflow. Below the island, at a depth of about 15 meters, there is the Geest base. The highest elevation of the island is the look-out dune, which is 17 meters above sea level. The remaining sand dunes reach heights of up to 12 meters.

Area 
With an area of 7.94 square kilometers (2008), Wangerooge is the second smallest of the inhabited East Frisian islands after Baltrum, and the larger areas can be up to 8.5 square kilometers. Higher values include beach areas that lie below the mean tide line (Mittleres Tidehochwasser, MTHW), but these are regularly washed over by the sea water of the North Sea and are, therefore, not considered as land areas. Since part of the land area, about 2.97 square kilometers, is not municipalized as a part of a federal waterway, the area of the municipality of Wangerooge covers only 4.97 square kilometers.

See also 
 East Frisian Islands
 List of ferry boats of the East Frisian Islands

References

External links

 
Ferry schedules

 
Geography of Lower Saxony
Islands of Lower Saxony
Seaside resorts in Germany
East Frisian Islands
Car-free zones in Europe
Friesland (district)